The de Havilland family is an Anglo-Norman family, belonging to landed gentry that originated from mainland Normandy and settled in Guernsey in the Middle Ages. A branch of the family resided for many years at Havilland Hall near Saint Peter Port in Guernsey.

Family members by birth
 Peter de Havilland (1747–1821), Bailiff of Guernsey and great-grandfather of Walter
 Thomas de Havilland (1775–1866), army officer and son of Sir Peter
 Walter de Havilland (1872–1968), British patent attorney and Go player, half-uncle of Sir Geoffrey
 Geoffrey de Havilland (1882–1965), founder of the aircraft company
 Hereward de Havilland (1894–1976), British aviator, brother of Sir Geoffrey
 Geoffrey de Havilland Jr. (1910–1946), test pilot, son of Sir Geoffrey
 Olivia de Havilland (1916–2020), British-American actress, daughter of Walter and sister of Joan
 Joan de Beauvoir de Havilland, known as Joan Fontaine (1917–2013), British-American actress, daughter of Walter and sister of Olivia
 John de Havilland (1918–1943), test pilot, son of Sir Geoffrey
 Will de Havilland (born 1994), English professional footballer

Family members by marriage
 Brian Aherne (1902–1986), actor and husband of Joan
 William Dozier (1908–1991), actor and husband of Joan
 Lilian Fontaine (1886–1975), actress and wife of Walter
 Marcus Goodrich (1897–1991), screenwriter and husband of Olivia
 Collier Young (1908–1980), film producer and husband of Joan

References

 
English gentry families
Show business families of the United Kingdom